Raglan is a former New Zealand parliamentary electorate. It existed for three periods between 1861 and 1996 and during that time, it was represented by 13 Members of Parliament.

Population centres
In the 1860 electoral redistribution, the House of Representatives increased the number of representatives by 12, reflecting the immense population growth since the original electorates were established in 1853. The redistribution created 15 additional electorates with between one and three members, and Raglan was one of the single-member electorates. It was created by splitting the  electorate into two areas, and the eastern part was called , while the western part was called Raglan. The electorates were distributed to provinces so that every province had at least two members. Within each province, the number of registered electors by electorate varied greatly. The Raglan electorate had 482 registered electors for the 1861 election. In 1861 it was named Raglan, but that town had the only polling station between the southern boundary of the Mokau River and Waiuku, the majority being in the Auckland suburbs. The northern boundary was close to the centre of Auckland, bordering on Newton District. The southern boundary was the Mokau River and the eastern, the Great South Road.

The Raglan electorate was on the West coast of the Waikato region, and was based on the small town of Raglan.

In the 1911 electoral redistribution, the North Island gained a further seat from the South Island due to faster population growth. In addition, there were substantial population movements within each island, and significant changes resulted from this. Only four electorates were unaltered, five electorates were abolished, one former electorate was re-established (Raglan), and four electorates were created for the first time. Raglan was created by the Franklin electorate moving north, and the  electorate moving south.

The 1981 census had shown that the North Island had experienced further population growth, and three additional general seats were created through the 1983 electoral redistribution, bringing the total number of electorates to 95. The South Island had, for the first time, experienced a population loss, but its number of general electorates was fixed at 25 since the 1967 electoral redistribution. More of the South Island population was moving to Christchurch, and two electorates were abolished, while two electorates were recreated. In the North Island, six electorates were newly created, three electorates were recreated (including Raglan), and six electorates were abolished.

History
The Raglan electorate existed from 1860 to 1870, from 1911 to 1978, and then from 1984 to 1996. The first election was held on 11 February 1861 and was won by Charles John Taylor, who had previously represented the Southern Division electorate.

In 1996, Simon Upton who was then the MP for Raglan chose to become a list MP. He resigned in 2001.

Members of Parliament
The Raglan electorate was represented by 13 Members of Parliament.

Key

Election results

1946 election

 
 
 
 
 

In an electoral court ruling Baxter gained 2 votes while losing 83, while Johnstone lost 61 votes from the original result.

1946 by-election

1943 election

1938 election

1935 election

1931 election

1928 election

1927 by-election

Waring (Reform) was the great-grandfather of Marilyn Waring.

1925 election

1922 election

1919 election

1914 election

1911 election

 
 
 
 
 
 
 
 
 

 
 
 
 

 

Table footnotes:

1867 by-election

Notes

References

External links 
 1911 map (page 29) and description of boundaries
 1917 map (page 27) and description of boundaries
 1937 map
 1946 map

Historical electorates of New Zealand
1860 establishments in New Zealand
1870 disestablishments in New Zealand
1978 disestablishments in New Zealand
1996 disestablishments in New Zealand
1984 establishments in New Zealand
1911 establishments in New Zealand
Raglan, New Zealand
Politics of Waikato